Penrhyncoch Football Club is a semi-professional football club based in Penrhyncoch, Ceredigion, Wales, currently playing in the Cymru North the second tier of Welsh football.

The club was founded in 1965 and have played at their current home ground, Cae Baker, since its founding.

2022–23 Squad

Staff

Honours

Cymru Alliance
League Cup winners: 1998
Central Wales Challenge Cup
Winners: 2003, 2012
Mid Wales League
Champions; 2001–02, 2002–03, 2015–16
League Cup winners: 2000, 2001, 2015–16
Summer Cup winners: 2002, 2003
North Cards Cup
Winners: 1974, 1977, 1978, 1980, 2000, 2001
South Cards Cup
Winners: 1971, 1974, 1975, 1976, 1977, 1980, 1982
Aberystwyth and District League
Champions: 1971–72, 1974–75, 1975–76, 1976–77, 1977–78, 1997–98, 1998–99, 2005–06, 2011–12
Division Two Champions: 1985–86, 2003–04, 2004–05
League Cup Winners: 1970, 1974, 1998, 1999, 2002, 2004, 2005
Cards League
Ceredigion Cup Winners: 1979
Len & Julia Newman Cup
Winners: 1997, 1998, 2001
 Youth League Winners (U17) : 2007–08

References

Football clubs in Wales
Association football clubs established in 1965
Sport in Ceredigion
1965 establishments in Wales
Cymru Alliance clubs
Cymru North clubs
Aberystwyth League clubs